Petra Bartelmann (born 11 March 1962) is a German former footballer who played as a forward. She made 25 appearances for the Germany national team from 1982 to 1990.

References

External links
 

1962 births
Living people
German women's footballers
Women's association football forwards
Germany women's international footballers
Place of birth missing (living people)